Her von welken Nächten is the third studio album by the Austrian band Dornenreich.

Track listing

 "Eigenwach" – 6:44
 "Ich Bin Aus Mir" – 6:13
 "Wer Hat Angst Vor Einsamkeit?" – 6:19
 "Grell Und Dunkel Strömt Das Leben" – 5:00
 "Innerwille Ist Mein Docht" – 5:51
 "Hier Weht Ein Moment" – 6:30
 "Schwarz Schaut Tiefsten Lichterglanz" – 7:29
 "Trauerbrandung" – 6:17
 "Mein Publikum - Der Augenblick" – 8:30

External links
Her von welken Nächten @ Encyclopaedia Metallum

2001 albums
Dornenreich albums